Paul Currie may refer to:

 Paul Currie (director) (born 1968), Australian film director
 Paul Currie (footballer) (born 1985), Scottish footballer

See also
 Paul Curry (1917–1986), businessman and amateur magician
 Paul Curry (golfer) (born 1961), English golfer